Kora is a village and seat of the commune of Sougoulbé in the Cercle of Ténenkou in the Mopti Region of southern-central Mali. The village lies 10 km north-northeast of Ténenkou.

References

Populated places in Mopti Region